Levi Knight Fuller (February 24, 1841October 10, 1896) was the 44th governor of Vermont from 1892 to 1894.

Early life
Fuller was born in Westmoreland, Cheshire County, New Hampshire, and attended Brattleboro High School and later apprenticed as a machinist in Boston, also working as a telegrapher to finance additional studies in engineering and manufacturing.

Career with Estey Organ Company
Fuller became an engineer and executive with Brattleboro's Estey Organ Company, and in 1865 married Abby Estey, the owner's daughter.  He patented over one hundred inventions, including international standard pitch, an innovation that was adopted by manufacturers of musical instruments throughout the world, and called by the maker of Steinway pianos "perhaps the most important achievement in the annals of musical history."

Philanthropy and other pursuits
Fuller was also an astronomer, and built his own observatory and library.  He was a founder of North Carolina's Shaw University, the South's oldest historically African-American college.  Fuller served as a director of the Brattleboro Savings Bank and a trustee of Brattleboro Free Library.

Fuller was a member of the American Society of Mechanical Engineers, American Association for the Advancement of Science, Astronomical Society of the Pacific, and American Institute of Electrical Engineers.  He was active in the Sons of the American Revolution, and served as president of the Vermont chapter.

The University of Vermont conferred on Fuller an honorary master's degree in 1893, and Norwich University presented him an honorary LL.D. degree in 1895.

Military service
In the 1870s he organized the Fuller Light Battery.  Fuller equipped and funded the unit for two years, when it was accepted into the Vermont National Guard.  As a result of Fuller's efforts, the Vermont National Guard was the first state to field rifled artillery.  The Fuller Light Battery was noted for its efficiency and accuracy, and won numerous gunnery competitions.  In 1887 he was appointed a colonel on the staff of Governor Julius Converse.

Political career
A Republican, he served as a state senator from 1880 to 1881, and lieutenant governor from 1886 to 1887. In 1892 Fuller was selected as the Republican nominee for governor.  He won the general election and served the single two-year term then available to Vermont governors under the dominant Republican party's "Mountain Rule." (Under the Mountain Rule, the governorship rotated between residents of the east and west side of the Green Mountains, and governors served two years.) Active in the "good roads" movement of the late 19th century, Fuller's term was notable for the creation of Vermont's first statewide effort to regulate their construction and maintenance, the Board of Highway Commissioners.

Post-gubernatorial career and death
After serving as governor he returned to his work at Estey Organ.  Fuller's sudden death in Brattleboro on October 10, 1896, two years after leaving office, was attributed to overwork and anemia.  He was buried in Brattleboro's Morningside Cemetery.

References

Further reading
 Genealogical and Family History of the State of Vermont, edited by Hiram Carleton, 1903, pages 380 to 383
 Newspaper article, Working for Good Roads, New York Times, July 6, 1894
 Newspaper article, For Better Highways, Chicago Tribune, May 17, 1896
 Joint Resolution 340, On the Death of Ex-Governor Fuller, Acts and Resolves Passed by the General Assembly of the State of Vermont, 1896, pages 475 to 476
 Annals of Brattleboro, 1681–1895, Mary Rogers Cabot, 1922, Volume 2, Page 909 to 911
 Norwich University, 1819–1911; Her History, Her Graduates, Her Roll of Honor, by William Arba Ellis and Grenville Mellen Dodge, 1911, Volume 3, pages 528 to 529
 Manufacturing the Muse: Estey Organs & Consumer Culture in Victorian America, by Dennis Waring, 2002, pages 111 to 113
 A National Register of the Society, Sons of the American Revolution, published by the Society, 1902, page 974
 Vermont: The Green Mountain State, by Walter Hill Crockett, 1921, Volume 4, pages 226 to 227
 History of Ashburnham, Massachusetts, by Ezra Scollay Stearns, 1887, page 647
 Good Roads, League of American Wheelmen, Volume 6, July to December 1894, page 153
 Who's Who in America, John William Leonard and Albert Nelson Marquis, 1901, Volume 2, page 41
 Transactions of the American Society of Mechanical Engineers, published by the Society, 1897, Volume 18, page 1093
 The National Cyclopaedia of American Biography, published by James T. White and Company, New York, 1898, Volume 8, page 330

External links
 

1841 births
1896 deaths
Sons of the American Revolution
Republican Party governors of Vermont
Lieutenant Governors of Vermont
Republican Party Vermont state senators
People from Brattleboro, Vermont
Norwich University alumni
Deaths from anemia
Burials in Vermont
19th-century American politicians
Vermont National Guard personnel
People from Westmoreland, New Hampshire